Culcheth High School is a community school for students aged 11–16, located in Warrington, Cheshire. It serves many of the surrounding areas with a student base of over 1,000 students. In 2010, it opened a brand new £28,000,000 campus, combining the High School and Community Campus in one state of the art building.

Location 

Culcheth High School is located in Culcheth, a large village in Cheshire approximately 6 miles (10 km) north-east of Warrington, England. Historically it lay within the County of Lancashire. It is the principal settlement in Culcheth and Glazebury civil parish. The village has many amenities which make it a popular place to live. These include a library, a village hall, sports facilities, two supermarkets, and a wide range of smaller shops clustered in and around its centre. It has several restaurants, cafes, pubs and takeaways. It is primarily residential, with a large village green at its heart where the annual Community Day is held.

History

Blocks
When the school first opened in 1931 it was a single block, formerly known as 'A Block'. Over the years several other blocks were opened as the school expanded. The most recent block built was 'G Block'.

In 2010 when the new school campus was completed, all but one block of the old school was demolished, G block. G Block went up for sale with the intent for use as a community building.

Now the school has four blocks named after famous historical figures: S Block (William Shakespeare), K Block (Martin Luther King Jr.), C Block (Marie Curie) & B Block (Brunel).

Facilities 
The school has facilities for teaching and recording of music, with two suites of electronic instruments linked up to mac minis and a recording studio. For sports the school has: a large multi-use sports hall; an activity studio for use with dance/gym/trampolines; an AstroTurf pitch for all year round football and several rugby pitches and cricket strip. A full array of science labs, technology suites, and ICT rooms are at all levels in the school, which operates a full wireless network for laptops in each department and interactive ICT resources in every classroom. An open-plan restaurant and a cafe are on the ground level.

Being a community campus, the school has a gym and several community rooms which can be hired out by local groups and the community.

Sixth Form 
The sixth form closed at the end of the 2013/14 academic year. In the 2013-2014 academic year there were only 54 students who attended the sixth form.

Uniform 
Culcheth High School's uniform consists of a black blazer embroidered with the school badge, a plain white school shirt, the school clip-on tie and black shoes. Black trousers for the boys, and black logo skirt or plain trousers for the girls. The school's badge holds the traditional eagle, that the school adopted when it first opened in 1931, with a modern look. The school tie is black, with an eagle and two blue stripes.

Up until 2009, the school's logo was the original gold eagle, stitched on the school's blazer and embroidered on the tie with gold stripes.

References

External links
Ofsted Report 2009
Culcheth High School official website
Culcheth High School Ofsted Reports
Ofsted Report 2014

Secondary schools in Warrington
Educational institutions established in 1931
1931 establishments in England
Community schools in Warrington